Victor-Auguste Poulain (February 11, 1825 - July 30, 1918) was a French chocolatier and industrialist who founded the Chocolat Poulain brand in 1848.

See also
 Albert Poulain

References 

French businesspeople
Chocolatiers
Recipients of the Legion of Honour
1825 births
1918 deaths